Mustapha Allaoui (born 30 May 1983) is a Moroccan footballer who plays for Pluakdaeng United in Thailand.

Career

Club career
Born in Fes, Allaoui began his career for hometown club Maghreb Fez. He later joined FAR Rabat in summer 2005 On 14 August 2009, French Ligue 2 side, Guingamp signed the Moroccan striker from FAR Rabat on a three-year deal.

In February 2020, Allaoui joined Thai League 4 club Pluakdaeng United.

International career
Allaoui was part of the Moroccan 2004 Olympic football team, who exited in the first round, finishing third in group D, behind group winners Iraq and runners-up Costa Rica. He made a full international debut for Morocco on 12 August 2009 in a friendly against Congo.

References

External links

1983 births
Living people
Moroccan footballers
Moroccan expatriate footballers
Olympic footballers of Morocco
Footballers at the 2004 Summer Olympics
Maghreb de Fès players
AS FAR (football) players
Wydad AC players
En Avant Guingamp players
Al-Qadsiah FC players
Khor Fakkan Sports Club players
Khaitan SC players
Al-Nasr SC (Kuwait) players
MC Oujda players
JS Massira players
Saudi Professional League players
UAE First Division League players
Ligue 2 players
Championnat National players
Botola players
China League One players
People from Fez, Morocco
Association football forwards
Expatriate footballers in France
Expatriate footballers in China
Expatriate footballers in Saudi Arabia
Expatriate footballers in Kuwait
Moroccan expatriate sportspeople in France
Moroccan expatriate sportspeople in China
Moroccan expatriate sportspeople in Saudi Arabia
Moroccan expatriate sportspeople in Kuwait
Morocco international footballers
Kuwait Premier League players